Estrellas del Caos is a 2006 album, of the Venezuelan Ska band Desorden Público. It includes seventeen tracks.

Track listing
El caos en clave / Presentación
Hardcore Mambo
Hipnosis
No vale la pena
Antarjami
Espiritual
El Tren de la vida
Pegajoso
Crack
San Antonio
Baila mi cha cha ska
Uma Vacina
Sepulturero
Política criminal
Monkey ska
La Mona cumbita
Ella me espera

See also
Venezuela
Venezuelan music
Desorden Público

References

Estrellas del caos at Sincopa, The Guide to Venezuelan Music

2006 albums
Desorden Público albums